Emon Shakoor (إيمان عبد الشكور) is a neuroscience researcher turned a technology entrepreneur

Education 
Prior to her career in Entrepreneurship and Acceleration, Emon obtained her bachelor’s degree in Cognitive Science from the University of California, San Diego, and was a neuroscience researcher at the University of California, San Diego investigating the role of mirror neurons in social cognition.

Career
Emon Shakoor is the sole founder &. CEO. of Blossom Accelerator, Saudi Arabia’s first tech-inclusion and female focused accelerator. The company provides founders access to community, network, educational resources as well as curating investment opportunities. Emon also serves as an Advisory Board Member at OQAL Angel Investment Network.

Non-profit 
Emon Shakoor is a Jeddah Hub, Global Shaper, and was appointed as the delegate of 30 Under 30 group at the Annual Meeting of the World Economic Forum in Davos, Switzerland.

Emon co-founded a local non-profit startup event and initiative called the Techpreneurship Sprint in 2017. The event was in partnership with Prince Mohammad Bin Salman College of Business and Entrepreneurship. (MBSC). At this event the Saudi youth were challenged to build tech startups and think entrepreneurial.

Awards and recognition 
She was recognized as Saudi Arabia’s youngest founder & CEO to be invited at the Annual Meeting of the World Economic Forum in Davos, Switzerland.

She was recognized as a leading woman in the 20 Under 30 About Her List

Emon Shakoor’s scientific research on mirror neurons was honored for its excellence at UC. San Diego.

References 

Year of birth missing (living people)
Living people

Saudi Arabian neuroscientists